C. montana may refer to:

Carodista montana, a moth of the family Lecithoceridae
Cedrela montana, the Cedro tree, of the family Meliaceae
Centaurea montana, mountain cornflower
Choreutis montana, a moth of the family Choreutidae
Cicadetta montana, the New Forest cicada
Cigaritis montana, a butterfly
Clematis montana, the anemone clematis
Coccothrinax montana, a palm
Cochylimorpha montana, a moth of the family Tortricidae
Coleophora montana, a moth of the family Coleophoridae
Compsa montana, a beetle of the family Cerambycidae
Craspedortha montana, a moth of the family Sphingidae
Ctenisolabis montana, an earwig in the family Forficulidae
Cydia montana, a moth of the family Tortricidae
Cystopteris montana, mountain bladderfern